(Hail Mary), WAB 7, is a setting of the Latin prayer Ave Maria by Anton Bruckner.

History 

When staying in Wels during the summer of 1881 Bruckner met Luise Hochleitner, a singer with a beautiful alto voice. Bruckner promised to dedicate to her an Ave Maria. The work, which was composed on 5 February 1882, —almost 20 years after his more famous motet— is for alto (or baritone) solo voice and keyboard (organ, piano or harmonium).

The original manuscript is lost, but there are fair copies of it at the Österreichische Nationalbibliothek and the Abbey of Kremsmünster. The work was published in 1902 as an appendix to No. 13 of the Neue Musikzeitung, Stuttgart. The first public performance occurred during a concert of the Wiener Akademischer Wagner-Verein on 5 February 1903 by Gisella Seehofer, who then also premiered Bruckner's Wie bist du, Frühling, gut und treu and Im April.

Setting 
The 81-bar demanding work, scored in F major, requires a singer with a two-octave broad tessitura.

Like the two earlier settings of Ave Maria, the name Jesus is sung thrice (bars 23–31). It is followed by an instrumental interlude (bars 32–38) and goes then on with the second part (Sancta Maria), which quotes the 20-year earlier setting. Thereafter (bars 53–58) Nunc et in hora mortis nostrae is sung pianissimo in unison. After a repeat of Sancta Maria, it is ending by a two-octave descending arpeggio on Amen (from F5 to F3) and a short instrumental postlude (bars 76–81).

Selected discography 
The first recording was:
 Ingrid Günther (alto), Herbert Günther (BRT-Radio-Sinfonie-Orchester), Bruckner – Missa Solemnis in B – LP: Garnet G 40 170, c. 1980

In the majority of the about 20 recordings the singer is skipping the lower octave of the Amen. A selection among the few recordings, in which the singer is doing it faithfully:
 Anne-Marie Owens (mezzo-soprano), Peter King (organ), Mass No. 2 / Motets (Simon Halsey) – CD: Conifer CDCF 192, 1990
 Peter Matuszek (baritone), Vladimir Roubal (organ), Canti Sacri – CD: Rosa RD 151-2, 1994
 Sigrid Hagmüller (alto), Rupert Gottfried Frieberger (organ), Anton Bruckner – Oberösterreichische Kirchenmusik – CD: Fabian Records CD 5112, 1995
 Vera Ilieva (mezzo-soprano; transposed to A-flat major), Burkhard Pütz (organ), Ave Maria – CD: CSD 100 057, 1999

References

Sources 
 Anton Bruckner - Sämtliche Werke, Band XXI: Kleine Kirchenmusikwerke, Musikwissenschaftlicher Verlag der Internationalen Bruckner-Gesellschaft, Hans Bauernfeind and Leopold Nowak (Editor), Vienna, 1984/2001
 Cornelis van Zwol, Anton Bruckner 1824-1896 - Leven en werken, uitg. Thoth, Bussum, Netherlands, 2012. 
 Uwe Harten, Anton Bruckner. Ein Handbuch. , Salzburg, 1996. .

External links 
 
 Ave Maria F-Dur, WAB 7 (1856) Critical discography by Hans Roelofs 
 The following live performances can be heard on YouTube:
 Ulrike Martin (alto), Frederik Blum (piano), 2008: Ave Maria, WAB 7
 Ewa Mikulska (alto), Andrzej Mikulski (organ), 2011: Ave Maria, WAB 7
 Tatiana Rubinskaya (mezzo-soprano), Anasyasiya Sidelnikova (organ), 2012: Ave Maria, WAB 7
 Martha Swiderska (mezzo-soprano) with string quartet accompaniment, 2013: Ave Maria, WAB 7
 Martina Hübner (alto), Angela Amodio (organ), 2019: Ave Maria, WAB 7

1882 compositions
Motets by Anton Bruckner
Compositions in F major